David McLellan (born 10 February 1940) is an English scholar of Marxism. He has written extensively on the thought of Karl Marx, Friedrich Engels and Simone Weil.

Life
David McLellan was educated at Merchant Taylors' School and St. John's College, Oxford University. 

McLellan is currently visiting professor of political theory at Goldsmiths' College, University of London. He was previously professor of political theory at the Department of Politics and International Relations at the University of Kent. He has also been visiting professor at the State University of New York, guest fellow in politics at the Indian Institute of Advanced Study, Simla, and has lectured widely in North America and Europe.

Bibliography 
 The Young Hegelians and Karl Marx, 1969.
 Marx before Marxism, 1970.
 The Thought of Karl Marx: An Introduction, 1971.
 Karl Marx: His Life and Thought, 1973 (also published under the title Karl Marx: A Biography).
 Marx, Fontana Modern Masters, 1975.
 Marxism - an Introduction, Catholic Truth Society, 1976.
 Karl Marx: Selected Writings, 1977 .
 Engels, Fontana Modern Masters, 1977.
 Karl Marx: The Legacy, 1983.
 Marx: The first hundred years, 1983, Frances Pinter, London, .
 Marxism and Religion, 1987 .
 Marxism, 1988 .
 Simone Weil: Utopian Pessimist, 1989 .
 Utopian Pessimist: The Life and Thought of Simone Weil, 1990 .
 Unto Caesar, 1993 .
 Marxism after Marx, Harper & Row, 1980; MacMillan, 1998 .

References

External links 
 Kent faculty page
 Interviewed by Alan Macfarlane 17 December 2012 (video)

1940 births
Academics of Goldsmiths, University of London
Academics of the University of Kent
Alumni of St John's College, Oxford
English political philosophers
Living people
People educated at Merchant Taylors' School, Northwood
Scholars of Marxism